The 2017 Cork Junior A Football Championship was the 119th staging of the Cork Junior A Football Championship since its establishment by the Cork County Board. The draw for the 2017 fixtures took place on 11 December 2016. It was the first championship to include beaten divisional finalists. The championship ran from 9 September to 29 October 2017.

The final was played on 29 October 2017 at Páirc Uí Rinn in Cork, between Knocknagree and Erin's Own, in what was their first ever meeting in the final. Knocknagree won the match by 2–19 to 2–10 to claim their third championship title overall and a first title in 26 years.

Knocknagree's Anthony O'Connor was the championship's top scorer with 2-28.

Qualification

Results

First round

Quarter-finals

Semi-finals

Final

Championship statistics

Top scorers

Overall

In a single game

References

2017 in Irish sport
Cork Junior Football Championship